Phoenix Motor Company building, also known as the Dud R. Day Motor Company building, is a 1930 building created for the Phoenix Motor Company.  It was designed by Lescher and Mahoney, who also designed the Orpheum Theatre.  

After multiple owners, the building had been boarded over and covered with stucco, sitting empty.  The building was purchased by nightclub owners Pat Cantelme and Jim Kuykendall for $2.2 million in 2015. The building underwent significant rehabilitation and re-opened as the Van Buren music hall in 2017.

It was added to the Phoenix Historic Property Register in May 2017 and the National Register of Historic Places in 2018.

Renovation 
In 2016 Live Nation and Charlie Levy, founder of Stateside Presents and co-founder of Western Tread Recordings, began converting the building into a concert venue. After discovering original architectural elements such as storefront, doors, windows and roof trusses were maintained, the city of Phoenix Office of Historic Preservation provided a $250,000 grant for rehabilitation. The venue's interior was designed by Tucson, Arizona based Patch & Clark Design.

The Van Buren 
The Van Buren opened on August 23rd, 2017 (Cold War Kids was the inaugural performance). The 1,900 capacity concert hall was voted Best New Music Venue in 2017, Best Large Venue in 2019, and Best Medium-Sized Venue in 2020.

See also

 List of historic properties in Phoenix, Arizona
 Phoenix Historic Property Register

References

External links

 The Van Buren

Houses completed in 1931
National Register of Historic Places in Phoenix, Arizona